The Parkano railway station is located in the town of Parkano, Finland. The station was opened for passenger and cargo traffic in 1971, and is located about six kilometres from the Parkano main urban area.

Up to 1970, the station named Parkano was located in the Parkano main urban area on the track between Haapamäki and Pori. The old Parkano station was renamed Kairokoski railway station when the new station was opened.

The Parkano railway station was built in connection with the more direct track from Tampere to Seinäjoki to a place where the direct track crossed the track between Haapamäki and Pori. Originally, the station was not intended to serve passenger traffic. Only after public opposition, the VR Group decided to build a temporary barracks-style station building to serve passenger traffic. This station building is still in service.

Almost all passenger trains between Tampere and Seinäjoki stop at Parkano. The station also has cargo traffic, mostly carrying raw wood.

References

External links 
 

Railway stations in Pirkanmaa